Andreana Družina (26 January 1920 – 7 March 2021) was a Slovenian political commissar and partisan. She was awarded the Order of the People's Hero of Yugoslavia. Družina was born in Trieste, Italy, and died on 7 March 2021, at the age of 101.

References

Slovene Partisans
1920 births
2021 deaths
Slovenian centenarians
Women centenarians
Politicians from Trieste
Italian Slovenes
Recipients of the Order of the People's Hero